"Dive In" is a song by American R&B recording artist Trey Songz from his fifth studio album Chapter V. It was released on August 14, 2012 by Atlantic Records. The song peaked at number 77 on the Billboard Hot 100 and at number 5 on the Hot R&B/Hip-Hop Songs chart.

Music video
The music video was filmed in Malibu, California in early July 2012 by director Justin Francis and was released on October 7, 2012.

Charts

Weekly charts

Year-end charts

Certifications

References

External links

2012 singles
Trey Songz songs
2012 songs
Songs written by Trey Songz
Songs written by Troy Taylor (record producer)